Monster is the 29th album by jazz pianist Herbie Hancock. As a follow-up to the album Feets, Don't Fail Me Now (1979), it continued the trend of disco songs, lacking any jazz influence. The album features vocals on each track, this time without vocoder processing. The album also includes an appearance by Carlos Santana on the opening track "Saturday Night"; this track was the first of many eventual collaborations with Santana, including the 1980 album The Swing of Delight. The track "Stars In Your Eyes" was issued as an extended 12" single.

Track listing
"Saturday Night" (Jeffrey Cohen, Hancock, David Rubinson) - 7:13
"Stars in Your Eyes" (Lisa Capuano, Gavin Christopher, Hancock, Ray Parker Jr.) - 7:05
"Go for It" (Cohen, Hancock, Alphonse Mouzon, Rubinson) - 7:35
"Don't Hold It In" (Cohen, Melvin Ragin) - 8:02
"Making Love" (Hancock, Mouzon) - 6:23
"It All Comes Around" (Cohen, Ragin, Rubinson) - 5:49

Personnel
Herbie Hancock - synthesizer, acoustic piano, keyboards, vocals, clavinet, Minimoog, Oberheim 8 Voice, Prophet 5, clavitar
Carlos Santana (1), Randy Hansen (6), Wah Wah Watson - guitar
Freddie Washington,  - bass
Alphonse Mouzon - drums, synthesizer (3), keyboards
Sheila Escovedo - percussion
Gavin Christopher (2, 4), Greg Walker (1, 5), Oren Waters (3) - lead vocals
Bill Champlin - backing vocals, lead vocals (6)
Julia Tillman Waters, Luther Waters, Oren Waters, Maxine Willard Waters - backing vocals
Technical
David Rubinson, Fred Catero - engineer
Jeffrey Cohen - associate producer
Gahan Wilson - cover artwork

References

External links
 https://www.herbiehancock.com/album/monster/

1980 albums
Columbia Records albums
Herbie Hancock albums
Albums produced by Dave Rubinson